Executive Order 14005, officially titled Ensuring the Future Is Made in All of America by All of America's Workers, is an executive order signed by U.S. President Joe Biden on January 25, 2021, which ensures that the federal government invests taxpayer dollars in American-owned businesses. The order additionally appoints a new senior leader in the Executive Office of the President in charge of the government's Made-in-America policy approach.

On October 4, 2021, the White House Made in America Office launched madeinamerica.gov; a public website where the waivers under Made in America laws will be easy to find for businesses seeking contracting opportunities with Federal agencies.

See also 
 List of executive actions by Joe Biden

References

External links 
 US Presidential Actions
 Federal Register

Executive orders of Joe Biden
2021 in American law
January 2021 events in the United States